The  (sometimes also spelled ) is one of Thailand's national epics, derived from the Buddhist Dasaratha Jataka. Fundamentally, it is a Thai version of the Hindu epic Ramayana. Ramakien is an important part of the Thai literary canon.

A number of versions of the epic were lost in the destruction of Ayutthaya in 1767. Three versions currently exist, one of which was prepared in 1797 under the supervision of (and partly written by) King Rama I. His son, Rama II, rewrote some parts of his father's version for khon drama. The work has had an important influence on Thai literature, art and drama (both the khon and nang dramas being derived from it).

While the main story is similar to that of the Dasaratha Jataka, differences in some tales still prevail. Many other aspects were transposed into a Thai context, such as the clothes, weapons, topography, and elements of nature, which are described as being Thai in style. As Thailand is considered a Theravada Buddhist society, the Buddhist history latent in the  serves to provide Thai legends with a creation myth, as well as representations of various spirits which complement beliefs derived from Thai animism.

Background
The Jatakas including Dasaratha Jataka came to Southeast Asia by means of Buddhist missionaries, Indian traders and scholars who traded with the Khmer kingdoms (such as Funan and Angkor) and Srivijaya, with whom the Indians shared close economic and cultural ties.
The Thai adopted from the Khmer people components of Indianized culture such as the Hindu epic, Ramayana.

In the late first millennium, the epic was adopted by the Thai people. The history of the legends was told in the shade theater (Thai:), a shadow-puppet show in a style adopted from Indonesia, in which the characters were portrayed by leather dolls manipulated to cast shadows on a nearby screen while the spectators watched from the other side.

The Thai version of the legends was first written down in the 18th century, during the Ayutthaya Kingdom, following the demise of the Sukhothai government. Most editions, however, were lost when the city of Ayutthaya was destroyed by armies from Burma (modern Myanmar) in the year 1767.

The version recognized today was compiled in the Kingdom of Siam under the supervision of King Rama I (1726–1809), the founder of the Chakri dynasty, which still maintains the throne of Thailand. Between the years of 1799 and 1807, Rama I supervised the writing of the well-known edition and even wrote parts of it. It was also under the reign of Rama I that construction began on the Thai Grand Palace in Bangkok, which includes the grounds of the Wat Phra Kaew, the Temple of the Emerald Buddha.

This version differs slightly from the one compiled by Rama I, giving an expanded role to Hanuman, the god-king of the apes, and adding a happy ending.

Since its introduction to the Thai people, the  has become a firm component of the culture. The  of Rama I is considered one of the masterpieces of Thai literature. It is still read and is taught in the country's schools.

In 1989, Satyavrat Shastri translated the  into a Sanskrit epic poem (mahakavya) named , in 25 s (cantos) and about 1200 stanzas in 14 metres. This work won eleven national and international awards.

Content

Main figures

Divine beings 
 Phra Narai/WitsanuVishnu
 Phra IsuanShiva (who is also known by the epithet Ishvara)
 Phra PhromBrahma
 Phra Uma-thewiconsort of Phra Isuan (Parvati)
 Phra Laksamiconsort of Narai
 Phra In (Indra)king of  – lesser celestial deities.  Father of Phali.
 Mali Waratgod of Justice.  Grandfather of Thotsakan.
 Phra Athit (Surya)the solar deity.  Father of Sukhrip.
 Phra Phai (Vayu)the wind deity.  Father of Hanuman.
 Phra Witsawakam/Witsanukamthe artisan god, responsible for rebuilding Lanka after Hanuman burned it down and creating Khitkhin.

Human
 Phra Ramthe Bodhisatta, son of the king Thotsarot of Ayutthaya and the incarnation of Phra Narai.
 Nang Sidawife of Phra Ram, who embodies purity and fidelity.  Incarnation of Lakshmi.
 Phra Lak, Phra Phrot and Phra Sataruthalf-brothers of Phra Ram, who represent the reincarnated possessions of Phra Narai.
 Thotsarotoften called Thao Thotsarot. King of Ayutthaya and father of Phra Ram and his brothers.
 Nang Kaosuriyaone of the three wives of Thotsarot, mother of Phra Ram.
 Nang Kaiyakesione of the three wives of Thotsarot, mother of Phra Phrot.
 Nang Samutthewione of the three wives of Thotsarot, mother of Phra Lak and Phra Satarut.

Allies of Phra Ram
 Hanumangod-king of the apes, who supported Phra Ram and acted as the monkey general.
 Phali Thiratking of Khitkhin, elder brother of Sukhrip and uncle of Hanuman.
 Sukhripviceroy of Kitkin, younger brother of Phali and uncle of Hanuman.
 Ongkhotape-prince and son of the Pali Thirat and Nang Montho, cousin of Hanuman.
 Phiphekestranged brother of Thotsakan.  He is an excellent astrologist and provided valuable information to Phra Ram in defeating Thotsakan.
 Chomphuphanape-prince and adopted son of Phali, an expert in the healing arts and acted as the troop's medic.

Enemies of Phra Ram
 Thotsakan (from )king of the Demons of Lanka and strongest of Phra Ram's adversaries. Thotsakan has ten faces and twenty arms, and possesses a myriad of weapons.
 Intharachita son of Thotsakan. Phra Ram's second most powerful adversary. Intharachit uses his bow more than any other weapon. He once fired arrows (Nagabat Arrows) which turned into Nagas (or snakes) in mid-air and rained down on Phra Ram's army. He once had a blessing from the Phra Isuan that he shall not die on land but in the air, and if his severed head were to touch the ground, it will bring down great destruction.
 Kumphakanbrother of Thotsakan and commander of demonic forces.
 Maiyarapking of the Underworld, embodied as a donkey.
 Khon, Thut and Trisianyounger brothers of Thotsakan, and the first three to be killed by Phra Ram, in that order.

Plot 
The text can be split into three logical parts: the first one dealing with the origins of the main characters, the second depicting the dramatic events including the fall of Thotsakan, and the final part describing what happened afterwards.

Part One 
The first part begins with the story of Phra Narai in the form of a boar vanquishing the demon Hiranyak. This is followed by an account of the origins of the ancestors of Thotsakan. According to Ramakien, Phra Isuan grants his servant Nonthok a boon which enables him to change his finger into a diamond and destroy anyone at whom he points it. As Nonthok begins to abuse this power, Phra Narai assumes the form of a charming woman who dances in front of Nonthok, who tries to imitate the movement of her hands. At one moment, he points the diamond finger towards himself and instantly dies. Nonthok is later reborn as Thotsakan. He also has four brothers and a sister, as well as half-siblings. Thotsakan first marries Kala Akhi, the daughter of Kala Nakha of the underworld, and later receives Nang Montho as a gift from Phra Isuan. Thotsakan and Nang Montho have a son with the first name Ronapak; after his victory over Indra, he is called Intharachit.

The text then explains the origins of the simian characters Phali and Sukhrip. They are born to Kala Acana, the wife of king Khodam, as a result of her adultery with Phra In and Phra Athit. When king Khodam immerses them in a lake to test their legitimacy, they turn into monkeys and vanish into the forest. Phra Isuan grants Phali a magic trident which will transfer to Phali half the strength of anyone fighting him. Sukhrip is rewarded with a beautiful young maiden Dara, but Phali takes her for himself. Later, Phali also seizes Thotsakan's consort Nang Montho and they have a son named Ongkhot before she is returned to Thotsakan. Finally, Phali banishes Sukhrip to the forest where he meets Hanuman.

Hanuman is said to be born after Phra Isuan places his celestial weapons in the mouth of Sawaha, the daughter of Kala Acana. Hanuman at first stays with Phali and Sukhrip, but later decides to join Sukhrip in his banishment in the forest.

Rama, known in the Ramakien as Phra Ram, has ancestors tracing back to Phra Narai through King Thotsarot. Phra Ram himself is a reincarnation of Phra Narai, and his brothers Phra Lak, Phra Phrot and Phra Satarut are manifestations of Phra Narai's emblems: the serpent, the discus, and the mace, respectively. Phra Ram's consort Nang Sida is a reincarnation of Phra Narai's consort Laksami, but she is born as the daughter of Thotsakan in Lanka and adopted by king Chonok of Mithila.

Part Two 
Part two deals with the main drama of the story. Phra Ram and Nang Sida fall in love at first sight before an archery contest. A hunchback named Kucci instigates the queen to ask for the banishment of Phra Ram. He sets off to live in the forest with Nang Sida and his brother Phra Lak, where they meet Sammanakha who took on the form of a beautiful maiden. She tries to seduce the two brothers, but they resist and punish her. As revenge, Thotsakan abducts Nang Sida to his palace in Lanka.

Phra Ram and Phra Lak meet Hanuman, Sukhrip and another monkey, Chomphuphan, and ask them to help find Nang Sida. When Hanuman locates Nang Sida in Lanka, he identifies himself by showing her ring and kerchief and retelling the secret of her first meeting with Phra Ram. Hanuman is then caught by Thotsakan's son Intharachit, but escapes while setting Lanka on fire. On returning to Phra Ram, Hanuman helps build a causeway connecting Lanka to the mainland and the war with Thotsakan begins. After a lot of fighting and attempts of treachery by Thotsakan's allies, Phra Ram manages to kill Thotsakan and Intharachit and free Nang Sida. After she passes a fire ordeal to test her faithfulness, Phra Ram takes her with him to Ayutthaya and grants various parts of his kingdom to his allies.

Part three 
After Nang Sida draws a picture of Thotsakan on a slate, Phra Ram orders Phra Lak to take her to the forest and kill her. Instead of doing as commanded, he brings to Phra Ram the heart of a doe to trick him into believing that Nang Sida is dead. In the forest, Nang Sida finds refuge with a hermit named Wachamarik, and she gives birth to two sons: Phra Monkut and Phra Loph. Phra Ram decides to take her back to Ayutthaya, but she refuses and disappears into the Underworld. Finally, Phra Isuan brings Phra Ram and Nang Sida together again.

See also

Thai literature
Hikayat Seri Rama
Kakawin Ramayana
Phra Lak Phra Lam
Ramayana
Versions of Ramayana
Reamker
Yama Zatdaw

References

Further reading
Thai Ramayana (abridged) as written by King Rama I, 
The story of Ramakian – From the Mural Paintings along the Galleries of the Temple of the Emerald Buddha,

External links
NAMELIST AND PICTURES OF RAMAKIEN CHARACTERS
English and Thai text of the work, with audio reading in Thai
A Ramakian Tale – Thai Ramakien Myth (Youtube audio book series)

Epic poems in Thai
Works based on the Ramayana